The National Conference for Community and Justice is an American social justice organization focused on fighting biases and promoting understanding between people of different races and cultures.
The organization was founded in 1927 as the National Conference of Christians and Jews in response to anti-Semitism and anti-Catholic sentiment surrounding Al Smith's run for President.

History
The NCCJ was established in 1927 by social activists, including Jane Addams and US Supreme Court Justice Charles Evans Hughes, to bring diverse people together to address interfaith divisions.
Over the course of its history, the organization expanded its purview to all issues of social justice; in 1998 its name changed from "National Conference of Christians and Jews" to "National Conference for Community and Justice". A number of regional offices exist under the auspices of the National Federation for Just Communities.

Programs and events
The NCCJ promoted inclusivity through various events and programs.
One of the first was the "Tolerance Trio", a traveling roadshow which toured the country with a priest, a rabbi, and a clergyman, all making jokes and providing entertainment.
Throughout its tenure, the NCCJ offered interfaith events, school-age programs, and youth leadership programs aimed at promoting values such as understanding, respect, and community building.

Anytown
The "Anytown" program began in the 1950s and was designed for youth ages 14–18. It was intended to educate and empower its participants through multi-day intensive retreats.

Brotherhood Week

The NCCJ promoted a "National Brotherhood Day" in the 1930s, expanding to Brotherhood Week starting in 1936 with President Franklin D. Roosevelt named honorary chairman.
In 1944 the week included extensive radio programming, military and USO participation, and an "education program of nationwide scope" aimed at "extending good will and understanding among religious groups".
By the early 2000s the event had lost relevancy and was eventually canceled.

Tom Lehrer satirized National Brotherhood Week in a 1965 song of the same name, recorded on his album That Was the Year That Was.

See also

 Jane Addams
 S. Parkes Cadman
 Charles Evans Hughes

References

1927 establishments in the United States
Community organizations
Interfaith organizations
Religious organizations based in the United States
Social justice organizations
Organizations established in 1927